is a railway station in Soo, Kagoshima, Japan.

Lines

Layout 
The station, which is unstaffed, consists of an island platform serving two tracks with a siding, all on a low embankment. The station building, located at the base of the embankment, is a modern structure built in 2010 to resemble a log cabin. From there, a walk up a sloped access road leads to a footbridge which is used to access the island platform.

Platforms

JR

Adjacent stations

History
The station and the Kokuto East Line were then absorbed and were designated as part of the Nippō Main Line on 6 December 1932. With the privatization of Japanese National Railways (JNR), the successor of JGR, on 1 April 1987, the station came under the control of JR Kyushu.

In 2010, a new station building and toilet was opened by the local municipal authorities. The station building was built of local cedar wood in log cabin style and given the nickname "The Eternal Station Building".

See also
List of railway stations in Japan

References

External links 

Ōsumi-Ōkawara (JR Kyushu)

Railway stations in Japan opened in 1931
Railway stations in Kagoshima Prefecture